Fort Lauderdale Stadium was a baseball stadium located in Fort Lauderdale, Florida next to Lockhart Stadium. The stadium was demolished in June 2019 as part of the construction of Inter Miami CF Stadium for Inter Miami CF.

The New York Yankees announced in March 1961 that they would move spring training from St. Petersburg, Florida to Fort Lauderdale where a new stadium would be built for the team at an estimated cost of $500,000 with 4,000 covered seats and 4,000 bleacher seats.

The Yankees trained at the stadium between 1962 and 1995. The Fort Lauderdale Yankees of the minor league Florida State League played home games in the stadium from 1962 through 1992. The Fort Lauderdale Red Sox played home games there in 1993, after an unsuccessful attempt to move from Winter Haven to Fort Myers (they ended up the following year in Sarasota). 

The Baltimore Orioles held spring training at the stadium from 1996 to 2009. 

Fort Lauderdale Stadium was last leased to Traffic Sports USA (owners of the Fort Lauderdale Strikers) in June 2011.

References

External links
 Fort Lauderdale Stadium on Strikers' Website
 Fort Lauderdale Stadium at Ballparks of Baseball
 Fort Lauderdale Stadium at Digital Ballparks

Grapefruit League venues
Baltimore Orioles spring training venues
New York Yankees spring training venues
Tourist attractions in Fort Lauderdale, Florida
Buildings and structures in Fort Lauderdale, Florida
Sports in Fort Lauderdale, Florida
1962 establishments in Florida
Sports venues completed in 1962
Sports venues demolished in 2019
Sports venues in Broward County, Florida
2019 disestablishments in Florida